The Nicaraguan ambassador in Taipei was the official representative of the Government in Managua to the government in Taipei until Nicaragua’s decision to recognize the Beijing government as the sole legitimate Chinese government.

List of representatives

References

 
Taiwan
Nicaragua